Huaishu is a town under the administration of Jinzhou City in southwestern Hebei province, China, located about  north-northeast of downtown Jinzhou opposite G1811 Huanghua–Shijiazhuang Expressway. , it has 18 villages under its administration.

See also
List of township-level divisions of Hebei

References

Township-level divisions of Hebei